Jon Narbett (born 21 November 1968) is an English retired professional footballer who made over 100 appearances for Hereford United. He also played for Shrewsbury Town, Oxford United and Chesterfield before a cruciate knee ligament injury cut his career short in 1996.

Notes

External links 
Jon Narbett

English footballers
1968 births
Living people
English expatriate footballers
Expatriate footballers in Sweden
English Football League players
Association football midfielders
Shrewsbury Town F.C. players
Hereford United F.C. players
Oxford United F.C. players
Chesterfield F.C. players
Worcester City F.C. players